Juan Cornago (Johannes Cornago) ( 1400 – after 1475) was a Spanish composer of the early Renaissance.

Life
Almost nothing is known of Cornago's origins. He may be the Juan Carnago of Calahorra, La Rioja, Spain, who solicited Pope Martin V for prebends in various parishes between 1420 and 1429. It is certain that he is the Cornago, a Franciscan, who graduated from the University of Paris in 1449. Then from 1453 he was in Naples serving in the royal chapel of Alfonso V of Aragon. After the death of Alfonso he continued to serve in the chapel under his son Fernando I of Naples. Cornago was the leading songwriter at the Aragonese court in Naples. Later in 1475 he transferred to the chapel of Fernando the Catholic who had returned to Spain.

Works
15 compositions survive.
 4 in Latin
 8 in Spanish
 3 in Italian

Recordings
For fuller information see the extensive discography on Spanish Wikipedia.
 Misa de la mapa mundi, His Majestie's Clerkes dir Paul Hillier, Harmonia Mundi
 Columbus Paraisos Perdidos Jordi Savall. 2SACD AliaVox
 Isabel I – Reina de Castilla 1451–1504. Jordi Savall. AliaVox
 Alfons V. el Magnanim – El Cancionero de Montecassino. Jordi Savall. 2CD AliaVox
 O Tempo Bono. Music at the Aragonese Court of Naples. Florilegio Ensemble. Marcello Serafini. Symphonia 00180.
 Ars Moriendi. Huelgas Ensemble, dir. Paul Van Nevel. Alpha LP.
 Moro perchè non-day fede. on Fantasiant, música i poesia per a Ausiàs March Capella de Ministrers, dir. Carles Magraner.

References

1400s births
1470s deaths
Renaissance composers
Spanish classical composers
Spanish male classical composers